Matthew James Colwell (born 12 July 1986), better known by his stage name 360, is an Australian hip hop recording artist. He has released four studio albums: What You See Is What You Get (2008); Falling & Flying (2011), which peaked at No. 4 on the ARIA Albums Chart and was certified platinum; Utopia (2014), and Vintage Modern (2017). 360's second album provided four charting singles, including "Boys like You", which peaked at No. 3 on the ARIA Singles Chart and was certified 4× platinum. At the ARIA Music Awards of 2012, he received six nominations and won the 'Breakthrough Artist – Release' award for Falling & Flying, while Styalz Fuego won the ARIA 'Producer of the Year' Artisan award for the same album.

Early life
360 was born on 12 July 1986. He attended Luther College in Melbourne's eastern suburbs and graduated from Box Hill Senior Secondary College.

Music

2003-2006: Early Career
360 made his first official appearance in 2003 on fellow Australian rapper Infallible's EP A Burning Ambition, on the track "Situation Critical" along with MCs Hunter and Versa. The following year, he released his debut solo EP, titled Rarities, in which three of its four tracks featured his rap partner and best friend Pez.

In 2005, Pez and 360 released a song called "Nutcase", which 360 described as a "fuck around track [that was] written and recorded in one day. Trying to make you laugh, or cringe". 360 was featured on Sydney producers Weapon X and Ken Hell's 2006 mixtape Scar-Non III: Kick To The Head with the song "In Da Chub", a remix of 50 Cent's 2003 hit "In Da Club".

2007–2012: What You See Is What You Get, Falling & Flying
In February 2007, he signed to Soulmate Records. He released his debut album, What You See Is What You Get, on 22 March 2008. An InTheMix reviewer found 360 "not only showcases his hilariously funny comedic side but demonstrates his ability to approach more serious and personal issues, producing a well rounded album".

In a video interview for Peak Street Magazine, 360 described his musical style as a combination of "some pop influences, electro, dubstep, and unintelligent rhymes". On 14 January 2008, 360 released a music video of "Mamma Mia", which depicts his desire for Bec Hewitt and mocked her husband, Lleyton Hewitt, which was the Video of the Week on MySpace.com's Australian hip hop page. 360 described it as a comedic effort, "I wanted to take the piss out of them ... It's not meant to be taken too seriously she's not really my type". Management for the couple dismissed the rapper's effort as "a publicity stunt".

By March 2010, he remained signed with Soulmate Records, which had signed a distribution deal with EMI Records. In December that year, his single, "Just Got Started" (featuring Pez), was released. By March the following year, it peaked at No. 59 on the ARIA Singles Chart, and at No. 21 on the ARIA Urban Singles Chart.

360's second album, Falling & Flying, was released on 30 September 2011 which reached No. 4 on the ARIA Albums Chart, and remained in the number-one position of the Australian iTunes charts for three weeks. By October 2012, Falling & Flying was certified platinum by ARIA for shipments of 70,000 units, and was certified double platinum by July 2014.

In November 2011, the fourth single from the album, "Boys like You" (featuring Gossling), was released, which peaked at No. 3 on the Australian singles chart in February 2012. The track also reached the top 40 of the New Zealand Singles Chart. The single was certified 4× platinum by ARIA for shipments of 280,000 units. His following singles, "Child" (April 2012) and "Run Alone" (August), both reached the ARIA 'Singles Top 30' chart. "Child" was certified platinum and "Run Alone" received a gold certification.

The national Australian "Flying Tour" occurred in support of the album, and 360 was supported by new Melbourne artist Bam Bam.

2012–2021: Utopia & Vintage Modern
In June 2012, 360 revealed to national youth broadcaster Triple J that he was already working on his third album, describing the upcoming release as "quite a dark album". He described it further, "No one sees behind the scenes and there's been a lot of bad (expletive) going on in my family life and personal life". 360 hinted at a diverse production line-up for the album, saying he has "been getting a gang of beats from all different people".

A video, published on 21 November 2013, served as the official press release for the launch of Forthwrite Records, a music label created by 360 and Pez. 360 then confirmed the announcement on his Facebook page the following day, stating that the label will release Don't Look Down, by Pez, Utopia, by 360, and the debut, yet untitled Forthwrite album.

During his performance at the 2013 Sprung Hip Hop Festival, held in Brisbane, Australia, 360 garnered media attention for the manner in which he introduced a new song titled "On A Planet No One Knows". According to 360, the song, which also features a vocal sample from Joss Whedon regarding gender equality, is "about racism in Australia." 360 exclaimed:

In February 2014, 360 supported the Australian tour of American rapper Eminem, alongside Kendrick Lamar. 360 described the tour as a career highlight and explained to the media in January 2014 that it would be his first tour sober—he had previously struggled with drug addiction.

Prior to the release of the artist's third album, Utopia, on 13 June 2014, three singles were released: "Impossible", "On A Planet No One Knows" and "Sixavelli". "Impossible" is a collaboration with Daniel Johns, of Australian band Silverchair, and Johns also appears in the music video, in which he is a passenger in a car driven by 360. A music video was also released for the second single and was published on the artist's YouTube channel during the week before Australia Day. The music video for "Sixavelli" was directed by Claudia Sangiorgi Dalimore and was published in March 2014.

Alongside fellow Australian hip hop act Hilltop Hoods, 360 performed at the 2014 Splendour In The Grass festival, held in Byron Bay, Australia. The Australian "Utopia Tour" occurred during September 2014 and 360 was supported by US rapper Hopsin, UK artist Lunar C, Pez and Miracle.

2022-present: 
In January 2023, 360 released "Made Me Like This", his first release under new management company Lucky Ent and Teamwrk Records.

Collaborations
During the early years of his music career, 360 collaborated with Pez as part of a duo called "Forthwrite", including a track called "The Club Song" on the 2010 album Good Gracious, by producer M-Phazes. 360 also featured on Pez's 2008 single, "The Festival Song", which peaked at No. 14 on the ARIA Australian Singles Chart.

In 2010, 360 started an online musical project in the Australian hip hop scene, called "Rapper Tag", on YouTube. Rapper Tag involves one person recording a portion of rap over a looped beat, and then nominating ("tagging") another person to add further rapping over the same loop. The process continued in accordance with the nomination of the next rapper.

Australian hip hop duo Diafrix collaborated with 360 for the song "I'm A Dreamer", which appears on the 2012 album Pocket Full Of Dreams. 360 appeared on the self-titled debut album by Canberra producer, Ghosts in the Room, released on 14 September 2012 through Mudd Music. The album also features rappers Iron Solomon, Okwerdz and Kool G Rap.

Media appearances
360 was a panel member for the 20 October 2014 edition of the Australian Broadcasting Corporation (ABC) program Q&A. He appeared alongside Brian Cox, a particle physicist, Richard Gill, renowned conductor, and Nalini Joshi, a notable Australian mathematician, to discuss the topic of "passion". 360 garnered media attention for his comments on the television program regarding racism in relation to Australia, Australian hip hop and the Australian flag. When questioned by the presenter, 360 replied:

This response caused controversy, including the transference of the media spotlight onto Pez, who made comments on social media following 360's appearance. In addition to a message of support for his friend and musical collaborator, Pez also wrote that he also "got a bit offended"; however, he subsequently removed the sentence "To be honest, even I got a bit offended." from his original Facebook post. As of 24 October 2014, 360 had not retracted his Q&A comments and explained after the airing of the episode: "If you are not racist then you have nothing to be offended about."

Personal life

At the age of 18 years, 360 contracted a disease of his right eye, a cornea transplant, which "left him with fuzzy vision" in that eye. A July 2014 feature article in Rolling Stone Australia stated that he is "legally blind in his right eye", while his left eye is "slowly deteriorating due to the degenerative eye disease Keratoconus".

On 18 July 2010, 360 was involved in a go-karting accident while celebrating his birthday with Sydney-based hip hop artists Bliss n Eso. His accident resulted in a torn artery, lacerated pancreas and a damaged scrotum. According to the rapper, "It [scrotum] wasn't ruptured, but it was ripped open ... The first thing I checked once I woke up was I didn't need to use a colostomy bag. My sex life is intact. There's no sex appeal if you use a colostomy bag".

On 13 February 2012, 360 and Crystal Bale became engaged; the pair then separated on 24 December 2012.

As of October 2014, 360 is listed as a supporter of the 'Oscar's Law' campaign, which seeks to raise public awareness about the detrimental effects of factory farming of companion animals. He also appeared in PETA's 'Ink not Mink' anti-fur campaign.

360 and Bale promoted awareness of suicide and depression issues. In mid-February 2012, he posted a video clip with the following statement: "I don't usually drop serious videos, but this is something I'm passionate about spreading awareness about. Even if you hate me, this has nothing to do with music—please share this around so as many people as possible can see it". In September 2012, Bale posted her video, 'A Message from Crystal', which Beats Factorys Robyn Morrison described as footage of Bale "talking about how she has been affected by suicide—multiple times ... [it] is sometimes hard to watch, but essential viewing".

On 8 January 2016, 360 posted a song named "I'm Sorry" to his Facebook page, which addressed his codeine addiction and subsequent overdose. His addiction resulted in him cancelling tours without notice. In the song 360 mentions how he didn't tell anyone because he felt like a burden. Because he was addicted to Nurofen Plus, the pills could be bought without a prescription.

In September 2016, 360 announced that he was diagnosed with unipolar depression.

As of 2021, 360 frequently livestreams himself writing rap lyrics as well as performing new material live for his fans. 360 also revived an old Australian hip-hop trend of "rapper tag" (which he started), encouraging fellow Australian rappers to participate in the rap challenge.
He also continues to promote his message of healthy living and mental health awareness through his livestreams.

Discography

Studio albums

Singles

Promotional singles

Notes

Awards and nominations

AIR Awards
The Australian Independent Record Awards (commonly known informally as AIR Awards) is an annual awards night to recognise, promote and celebrate the success of Australia's Independent Music sector.

|-
| AIR Awards of 2011
| 360 
| Jägermeister Most Hunted Award (Most Popular as voted by fans)
| 
|-
| rowspan="4"| AIR Awards of 2012
| 360 
| Best Independent Artist
| 
|-
| rowspan="2"| Falling & Flying
| Best Independent Hip Hop Album
| 
|-
| Best Independent Album
| 
|-
| "Boys Like You"
| Best Independent Single
| 
|-

APRA Awards
The APRA Awards are presented annually from 1982 by the Australasian Performing Right Association (APRA), "honouring composers and songwriters".

! 
|-
| rowspan="6"| 2013 
| 360, Styalz Fuego
| Breakthrough Songwriter of the Year
| 
| 
|-
| rowspan="3"| "Boys Like You" – 360 featuring Gossling (Kaelyn Behr,Matthew Colwell, Francis Jones, Bradford Pinto, Jack Revens)
| Most Played Australian Song of the Year
| 
| 
|-
| Urban Work of the Year
| 
|
|-
| Song of the Year
| 
| 
|-
| rowspan="2"|  "Child" (Kaelyn Behr, Matthew Colwell)
| Urban Work of the Year
| 
|
|-
| Song of the Year
| 
| 
|-
| 2014 
| "Run Alone" (Kaelyn Behr, Matthew Colwell)
| Urban Work of the Year
| 
| 
|-
| 2018 
| "Yesterday" (featuring Hein Cooper) (Kaelyn Behr, Matthew Colwell, Martin Nicholas, Hein Cooper)
| Song of the Year
| 
| 
|-

ARIA Awards
At the ARIA Music Awards of 2012, 360 was nominated in six categories and won the 'ARIA Award for Breakthrough Artist - Release' for Falling & Flying, while Feugo won the 'Producer of the Year' in the Artisan section.

|-
| rowspan="10" | 2012 || rowspan="3" | Falling & Flying || Album of the Year ||  
|-
| Best Urban Album || 
|-
| Breakthrough Artist – Release || 
|-
| Falling & Flying – 360 || Best Male Artist ||  
|-
| Falling & Flying – Styalz Fuego || Producer of the Year ||  
|-
| Falling & Flying – Scott Horscroft, Phillip Threlfall || Engineer of the Year ||   
|-
| Falling & Flying – Debaser || Best Cover Art ||  
|-
| "Boys like You" (featuring Gossling) || Song of the Year ||  
|-
| "Boys like You" (featuring Gossling) – Alex Weltlinger || Best Video ||  
|-
| The Flying Tour || Best Australian Live Act ||  
|-
| rowspan="2" | 2014 || rowspan="2" | Utopia || Best Urban Album ||  
|-
| Best Cover Art ||  
|-
| rowspan="1" | 2018 || rowspan="1" | Vintage Modern || Best Urban Release ||  
|-

EG Awards / Music Victoria Awards
The EG Awards (known as Music Victoria Awards since 2013) are an annual awards night celebrating Victorian music. They commenced in 2006.

|-
| EG Awards of 2012
| 360
| Best Male
| 
|-

References

External links
 
 360's battle profile on Rap Grid
 360 rapper profile on VerseTracker

1986 births
APRA Award winners
ARIA Award winners
Australian hip hop musicians
Living people
Rappers from Melbourne
Australian male rappers
People with mood disorders